was a bureaucrat, politician and cabinet minister in both early Shōwa period Japan and in the post-war era.

Biography
Ōdachi was born in what is now Hamada, Shimane, as the younger son of a local sake brewer. After his graduation in 1916 from the law school of Tokyo Imperial University, he entered the Home Ministry. He rose to the post of Deputy Manager of the Local Affairs Bureau, and was appointed governor of Fukui Prefecture in 1932.

In 1934, Ōdachi was appointed Secretary of Internal Affairs and Communications of the Management and Coordination Agency of Manchukuo. He assisted Naoki Hoshino is developing the first Five-Year Plan for Manchukuo, which had a strong emphasis on the development of heavy industry. He returned to Japan in 1939, and served as a bureaucrat in the Home Ministry during the administrations of Nobuyuki Abe and Mitsumasa Yonai.

Following the start of World War II, on 7 March 1942 Ōdachi was appointed civilian mayor of Shōnan (Singapore) under Japanese occupation. During this period, he was critical of the heavy-handed military administration by the Imperial Japanese Army and its actions against the Chinese population, as well as civilian opportunists who sought to make quick profits under the occupation. His criticism of General Wataru Watanabe, the military administrator of Singapore led to Watanabe’s reassignment in 1943.

Ōdachi returned to Japan in 1943, and with the amalgamation of Tokyo City and Tokyo-fu into Tokyo Metropolis, he became the first Administrator of Tokyo, a position equivalent to the present Governor of Tokyo. As the war was quickly deteriorating for Japan, and Tokyo came under increasing threat of attack, he organized the evacuation of children from Tokyo. In September 1943, he gave the order to destroy all of the animals at Ueno Zoo, an act recounted in the post-war book Faithful Elephants. In July 1944, he was asked to join the cabinet of Prime Minister Kuniaki Koiso as Home Minister. Ōdachi was awarded the 1st class of the Order of the Sacred Treasure on September 12, 1944.

After the surrender of Japan, Ōdachi was (along with all other members of the wartime government) purged from public office by orders of the American occupation authorities. However, he was never accused of war crimes. In 1953, he ran for a seat in the post-war upper house of the Diet of Japan, under the Liberal Party banner.

With the support of Chief Cabinet Secretary Taketora Ogata, Ōdachi joined the 5th Yoshida administration as Minister of Education in 1953. Noted for his conservative, authoritarian outlook, he immediately came into conflict with the leftist Japan Teachers Union over its pro-Socialist curriculum in schools and due to his efforts to restore the teaching of "public morals" in schools. This led to the passage of a number of laws aimed at enforcing political neutrality in textbooks and in placing restrictions on the hiring of non-civil servants as educators in public schools in 1954. These laws continued to be criticized by the Japan Teachers Union in the 1950s and 1960s as indicative of the Reverse Course pursued by the Japanese government. 

Ōdachi died of stomach cancer in 1955 at the age of 63.

References
 Garon, Sheldon. The State and Labor In Modern Japan. University of California Press (2004). 
 Hunter, Janet.  A Concise Dictionary of Modern Japanese History . University of California Press (1994).

Notes

 

1892 births
1955 deaths
People from Shimane Prefecture
People of Manchukuo
Japanese occupation of Singapore
University of Tokyo alumni
Government ministers of Japan
Ministers of Home Affairs of Japan
Liberal Party (Japan, 1945) politicians
Members of the House of Councillors (Japan)
Deaths from cancer in Japan
Deaths from stomach cancer